The Betty Pusker Golf Classic was an annual golf tournament for professional women golfers on the Futures Tour, the LPGA Tour's developmental tour. The event was part of the Futures Tour's schedule from 1992 through 2007. It took place at The Pines Country Club in Morgantown, West Virginia.

The tournament was a 54-hole event, as are most Futures Tour tournaments, and included pre-tournament pro-am opportunities, in which local amateur golfers can play with the professional golfers from the Tour as a benefit for local charities. The benefiting charity for the Betty Pusker Golf Classic was the Betty Puskar Breast Care Center.

The tournament was last held August 10–12, 2007.

Winners

*Tournament shortened to 36 holes because of rain.
**Tournament was 72 holes.

Tournament records

External links
Futures Tour official website

Former Symetra Tour events
Golf in West Virginia
Recurring sporting events established in 1992
Recurring sporting events disestablished in 2007